Mohamed Elsayed is also the alias of Mohamed Atta

Mohamed Elsayed is an Egyptian boxer who competed in the heavyweight class (81 – 91 kg) at the 2004 Summer Olympics.

Career

 

In 2003 he captured the silver medal in his weight division at the All-Africa Games in Abuja, Nigeria when he lost the final to local Emmanuel Izonritei.

At the Olympics he made it to the semi finals, but was stopped when a medical test revealed that he had a broken arm. He did receive a bronze medal.

Olympic results
Defeated Igor Alborov (Kazakhstan) 18-18, countback decision
Defeated Adam Forsyth (Australia) 27-12
Lost to Viktar Zuyev (Belarus) walk-over

References

External links
 Mohamed Elsayed at Egyptian Olympic Committee

1973 births
Living people
Olympic boxers of Egypt
Boxers at the 2004 Summer Olympics
Heavyweight boxers
Olympic medalists in boxing
Egyptian male boxers
Medalists at the 2004 Summer Olympics
Olympic bronze medalists for Egypt
African Games silver medalists for Egypt
African Games medalists in boxing
Competitors at the 2003 All-Africa Games
21st-century Egyptian people